Kernell may refer to:
Amanda Kernell (born 1986), Swedish, Southern Sami director and screenwriter
Mike Kernell (1951- ), American politician